Animal Magic may refer to:
 Animal Magic (TV series), a BBC children's television series, 1962–1983
 Animal Magic (The Blow Monkeys album), 1986
 Animal Magic (Bonobo album), 2000
 "Animal Magic" (song), by Belouis Some, 1987
 Animal Magic, a 1984 album by Australian band QED
 "Animal Magic", a song by Peter Gabriel from his 1978 self-titled album